Luise Vosgerchian (November 9, 1922 – March 13, 2000) was an American concert pianist and music professor at Harvard University.

Early life and education 
Vosgerchian was born in Watertown, Massachusetts in 1922, the daughter of Armenian immigrants. She studied at the New England Conservatory of Music. In 1948, The New York Times wrote about one of her recitals.

Career 
Vosgerchian began her career as a music instructor at Brandeis University. She began teaching at Harvard University in 1959 and was a mentor of many prominent musicians. Among her most notable students were Allison Charney, Yo-Yo Ma, Bobby McFerrin, Stephen Pruslin and Richard St. Clair.

Physicist Brian Greene described Vosgerchian in Until the End of Time as one of his most influential teachers, noting she "had a deep interest in how scientific discoveries relate to aesthetic sensibilities".

Harvard awards a Luise Vosgerchian Teaching Award.

Personal life 
She met Kamil Pagacik in Paris in 1949 and the two later married. After Vosgerchian's death in 2000, a memorial service was held for her at Sanders Theatre.

References

1922 births
2000 deaths
Harvard University faculty
New England Conservatory alumni
Brandeis University faculty
20th-century American pianists
20th-century classical pianists
20th-century American women pianists
American women classical pianists
American classical pianists

People from Watertown, Massachusetts
American expatriates in France